Kokoro: The Heart Within is a 1995 television series about Japan, originally airing on PBS. It was later rebroadcast on the Discovery Channel. The series was shot in 16mm and 35mm film, with most of the footage shot by the director, Scott Featherstone. In addition to an Emmy nomination, the series won a gold and silver medal at the New York Film Festival. The series consists of ten 30 minute episodes.

Episodes
Kokoro
Shinto: Way of the Gods
Bushido: Way of the Warrior
Oceans: Lifeblood of Japan
Makoto: Sincerity
Hiroshima: City of Peace
Nature: Giver of Blessings
Religion: Spiritual Heritage
Tradition: Inner Harmony
Heritage: Pride of Japan

PBS original programming
1995 American television series debuts
1990s American documentary television series